Gage Awards is an award that recognises and honours individuals, brands and corporate organisations leading in innovative internet use in entertainment, inspiration, information and commerce. It is an annual award hosted by GAGE Digital Company in Lagos, Nigeria. There are two categories of nominees, the public choice are identified and voted by members of the public and the panelist choice are nominated by the public and the jury selects the winners based on their innovative use of technology and digital media.

Categories 
Some of the award categories are not static; they are determined by trends in technology and activities on digital media platforms in a current year. Award categories include Online Comedian of the Year, Best Web Series of the Year, Best Actor in Web Series, Tiktok influencer of the Year, Food Influencer of the Year, Online Influencer of the Year, Online TV of the Year and Online News Platform of the Year,. Some past winners of the award are Jumia (Best E-commerce Website of the Year), United Bank for Africa’s REDTV (Online TV of the Year), Vbank (Mobile Banking App of the Year) Paystack (Digital Financial Platform of the Year), MTN Nigeria (Data Service Provider of the Year), Mr Macaroni (Online Comedian of the Year), Nengi Hampson (Influencer of the Year), Opera News (Online News Platform of the Year).

References 

Nigerian awards